The 2015 Tashkent Challenger was a professional tennis tournament played on hard courts. It was the eighth edition of the tournament which was part of the 2015 ATP Challenger Tour. The tournament took place in Tashkent, Uzbekistan between October 12–17, 2015.

Singles main-draw entrants

Seeds

 1 Rankings are as of October 5, 2015.

Other entrants
The following players received wildcards into the singles main draw:
  Sanjar Fayziev
  Temur Ismailov
  Jurabek Karimov
  Shonigmatjon Shofayziyev

The following player received entry using a protected ranking:
  Amir Weintraub

The following players received entry from the qualifying draw:
  Vladimir Ivanov
  Sergey Betov
  Ilya Ivashka
  Kevin Krawietz

Champions

Singles

  Denis Istomin def.  Lukáš Lacko, 6–3, 6–4.

Doubles

  Sergey Betov /  Mikhail Elgin def.  Andre Begemann /  Artem Sitak, 6–4, 6–4.

References

External links
Official Website

Tashkent Challenger
Tashkent Challenger